London The Punk Rock Collection is a CD containing all the MCA recordings of the 1970s punk band London.  All the group's A & B sides are included as well as their entire 1978 Animal Games album. In addition there are biographical notes and color photographs of the band's record sleeves. The album was released in 1997. Its catalogue number is AHOY CD77.

Personnel
 Riff Regan (Lead vocals)
 Jon Moss (Drums)
 Steve Voice (Bass & backing vocals)
 Dave Wight (Guitar)
 Simon Napier-Bell - Producer
 Hugh Jones - recording engineer
 John Van der Kiste - Liner notes

Track listing/composer
 No Time (Riff Regan)
 Animal Games (Riff Regan, Dave Wight, Jon Moss, Steve Voice)
 Reaction (Riff Regan & Steve Voice)
 Everyone's A Winner (Riff Regan)
 Summer Of Love (Riff Regan)
 Us Kids Cold (Riff Regan, Dave Wight, Jon Moss, Steve Voice)
 Young (Riff Regan)
 Good Looking Girls (Riff Regan & Steve Voice)
 Out On The Skids (Riff Regan & Steve Voice)
 Speed Speed (Riff Regan & Steve Voice)
 Swinging London (Riff Regan, Dave Wight, Jon Moss, Steve Voice)
 Everyone's A Winner (single version) - (Riff Regan)
 Handcuffed (Riff Regan & Steve Voice)
 Friday On My Mind (George Young & Harry Vanda)
 Siouxsie Sue (Steve Voice)

References

External links
The official London website

1997 compilation albums
London (punk band) compilation albums
Captain Oi! Records albums